The International School of Athens (ISA) is an independent and an International Baccalaureate (IB) School. ISA, formerly TASIS, a privately held school located in Kifissia, a suburb of Athens, Greece.

Education
ISA serves students from Nursery to 18. Its Melina campuses serve the needs of toddlers and preschoolers. The main campus develops the academic careers of students from 1st–12th grades offering the IB Diploma and College Preparatory programs to its high school students.

Language development
Both the international English community and the Greek community are served at ISA: Weekday programs focus on college and university-bound development, while weekend school focuses on English language development. In addition to English, ISA provides French, Spanish, German and Arabic as well as Mandarin Chinese language classes to adult learners.

Travel
ISA provides students with an opportunity to take part in sports travel to cities like Thessaloniki and throughout Europe to countries like Spain and Switzerland for senior trips and "ski week". There was also a trip in Bulgaria, Bansko.

Accessibility
ISA is accessible from the thoroughfares of Kifissias Avenue and Charilaou Trikoupi. Via train, Kifissia is situated at the northern end of Athens' Green Line. The school is within walking distance from the town center of Kifissia.

Gallery

References 

Educational institutions established in 1972
Education in Athens
Private schools in Greece
International Baccalaureate schools in Greece